Ethel Wright later Ethel Bradley (1866 – 1939) was a British portrait painter. Wright has several paintings in British national collections and her most famous work is a portrait of Suffragette Christabel Pankhurst, which currently resides at the National Portrait Gallery.

Work

Wright was born in London, England and later studied at the Académie Julian in Paris, France with the support and on the advice of renowned portraitist Solomon Joseph Solomon. By the late 19th Century she was regularly exhibiting as a society portraitist at The Royal Academy and achieved a profile as a painter in the 1890s identified in the modernist Rhythm Group.

She was also known for painting Pierrot.

Suffragette Portraits

Having achieved some recognition as a society portraitist, Wright became increasingly political as did her portraits. Wright became a supporter of the suffragettes. In 1909 Wright painted her most famous portrait, that of Christabel Pankhurst.

Her full length portrait of Christabel Pankhurst was exhibited at "The Women's Exhibition", hosted by the WSPU, funded by Clara Mordan and held at the Prince's Ice Rink in Knightsbridge in May 1909. Suffragette and marriage reformer, Una Duval, bought the painting and it remained in the family until being bequeathed by a descendent of the Duvals to the National Portrait Gallery in 2011, it was first exhibited by them in 2018.

In 1912, Wright also painted a full length portrait of Una Dugdale dressed in bright jade with a background of fierce fighting cocks, entitled "The Music Room". This painting was first shown in London’s Stafford Gallery in the same year and was exhibited as recently as 2020 in Pallant House Gallery, Chichester. Ethel Wright was also responsible for the portrait which was featured on Una Duval's marriage reform pamphlet "Love, Honour and not Obey".

She continued to support the suffragettes until 1927 and the Representation of the People (Equal Franchise) Act 1928 gave women electoral equality with men.

Legacy
Her painting of Christabel Pankhurst was donated by Una Duval's descendant to the National Portrait Gallery in 2011. It was exhibited in 2018 when it was noted that the gallery had previously only had pictures of suffragettes taken by the police as suspicious characters.

She achieved success as a painter but she was identified as a great woman artist.

Personal life

By 1898 she was exhibiting at the Oldham Gallery and "also known as Mrs Bradley" having become married, Wright died in 1939.

References

External links 
 

1866 births
1939 deaths
19th-century English painters
20th-century English painters
19th-century English women artists
20th-century English women artists
Académie Julian alumni
British portrait painters
English women painters
Painters from London